Filipp Metlyuk (born December 12, 1981) is a Russian professional ice hockey defenceman who currently plays for Salavat Yulaev Ufa of the Kontinental Hockey League (KHL). He has previously played with HC Yugra amongst 5 other KHL clubs.

References

External links

1981 births
Living people
Atlant Moscow Oblast players
Avangard Omsk players
Avtomobilist Yekaterinburg players
HC CSK VVS Samara players
HC CSKA Moscow players
HC Lada Togliatti players
Metallurg Magnitogorsk players
Metallurg Novokuznetsk players
HC Yugra players
Russian ice hockey defencemen
Sportspeople from Tolyatti